The following is a list of state by-elections for the Queensland Legislative Assembly held in the Australian state of Queensland:

2020–2029

2010–2019

2000–2009

1990–1999

1980–1989

1970–1979

1960–1969

1950–1959

1940–1949

1930–1939

1920–1929

1910–1919

1900–1909

1890–1899

1880–1889

1870–1879

1860–1869

References

Queensland by-elections Fact Sheet
 

Queensland state

By-elections